Ben Hunt (born 27 March 1990) is an Australian professional rugby league footballer who captains and plays as a  for the St. George Illawarra Dragons in the NRL and hooker for Australia at international level.

He previously played for the Brisbane Broncos in the National Rugby League, and at representative level for the Prime Minister's XIII and Queensland in the State of Origin series.

Background
Hunt was born in Rockhampton, Queensland, Australia.  He grew up in Dingo, playing junior rugby league with the Blackwater Crushers, in Blackwater before attending St. Brendan's College in Yeppoon.

Playing career

Hunt signed with the Brisbane Broncos as a youth player as a Hooker. In 2008 Hunt won the inaugural 2008 Toyota Cup (Under-20s) player of the year award and was also named in the team of the year, on the interchange bench. Hunt played halfback in the 2008 Toyota Cup Grand Final.  Hunt played 45 games, scored 27 tries and kicked 93 goals for 294 points in his U20s career from 2008 to 2009.

2009
Hunt went on to play one more match that season, in round 20 against the Gold Coast Titans in a 14–34 loss at Robina Stadium.

2010
In round 8, against the Newcastle Knights, Hunt scored his first NRL career try in Brisbane's 22–30 loss at Suncorp Stadium. The 2010 NRL season was seen as a breakthrough season for Hunt, as he played in 20 matches. After some impressive performances, that included scoring two tries, many were calling for Hunt to get a run as a starting . Although Hunt stayed as a bench player, he demonstrated that he could be Brisbane's future .

2011
After a shaky start to 2011, Hunt regained his form with an impressive performance against the Canberra Raiders in the Brisbane clubs 20–4 win at Canberra Stadium in round 2. After showing solid form off the bench, Hunt broke his finger in a round 9 clash against the Melbourne Storm, Hunt made his return in round 17 against the Parramatta Eels but was then stood down for a week with teammate Andrew McCullough after being charged with public nuisance following a night of drinking in the Brisbane CBD. Hunt later returned in round 19 in the Brisbane sides 30–10 win against the Gold Coast at Suncorp Stadium. Hunt went on to play in 19 matches and score a try for the Brisbane club in the 2011 NRL season.

2012
After the retirement of Brisbane captain Darren Lockyer, Hunt was nominated alongside teammate Corey Norman to fill the vacant  position. The pair battled out in the trials but Hunt eventually lost out to Norman, leaving Hunt on the bench for round 1. In round 7, against the Canberra Raiders, Hunt and Norman both got the chance to showcase their skills on the centre stage with regular halfback Peter Wallace a late withdrawal through injury. Norman and Hunt didn't disappoint with the pair combining beautifully as the Brisbane side ran out 30-6 winners at Suncorp Stadium. After the Broncos stumbled at the back end of 2012, losing 7 of 10 games en route to the finals, Hunt found himself in the five-eighth role with Norman dropped to the bench following poor form. Hunt found himself back on the bench as the Brisbane club were knocked out in the first week of the finals losing 33–16 against the North Queensland Cowboys. Over the course of the season, Hunt played in all 25 matches and scored a try.

2013
Hunt continued his bench role for the start of the 2013 NRL season as Brisbane made a shaky start. He got his first opportunity in his preferred halfback role in the round 9 clash against Parramatta, as Scott Prince suffered an injury in the opening minutes of the game. On 14 May, Hunt signed a new two-year deal with the Brisbane side. Towards the back end of the season, Hunt secured the halfback position after Peter Wallace was benched and Corey Norman was dumped to the Queensland Cup for the rest of the year, scoring a try in his first game. He played in 23 matches and scored two tries in 2013.

2014
In February 2014, Hunt was selected in the Broncos runners-up 2014 Auckland Nines squad. In June 2014, Hunt was named in the Queensland Maroons 22-man squad for game 2 as cover for halfback Daly Cherry-Evans, but Cherry-Evans recovered in time for the game, sending Hunt back to Brisbane. Hunt had an excellent season for the club, being one of the top contenders for the Dally M, finishing fourth in the votes and getting a pay rise to $450,000 a season. Hunt finished off the 2014 NRL season with playing in all of Brisbane's 25 matches, scoring 13 tries and kicking 21 goals.

On 14 October 2014, Hunt was selected for the Australia 2014 Four Nations 24-man squad. Hunt made his international debut for Australia against England at AAMI Park, coming off the interchange bench and scoring a try just after a couple of minutes of coming onto the field in Australia's 16–12 win. Hunt played off the interchange bench and scored a try in the Kangaroos 18-22 Four Nations final loss over New Zealand at Westpac Stadium. On 1 October 2014, Hunt re-signed with the Broncos until the end of the 2017 season.

2015
In round 6, against the Sydney Roosters, Hunt scored 2 tries, one of them in golden point extra time, to win the match for Brisbane 22–18. In round 25, against the South Sydney Rabbitohs, Hunt scored his first NRL hat trick of tries in the 47–12 win at the Sydney Football Stadium. On 4 October 2015, in the 2015 NRL Grand Final against the North Queensland Cowboys, Hunt played at halfback in the Brisbane's historic golden point 16–17 loss. Hunt was heavily talked about after the match after a horror last three minutes, first being penalized for a lifting tackle on North Queensland centre Kane Linnett which resulting in Hunt being placed on report for the tackle. In Brisbane's last set with ball in the match, Hunt got his hands on the ball 44 metres out from Brisbane's line, but a loose carry resulted in a one-on-one strip from Kyle Feldt, who shortly after scored the try in the corner to tie up the match at 16-all. Four seconds into extra time, with the ball spiralling in the air, Hunt set himself underneath the ball but knocked on, which gave North Queensland the opportunity win the match when their captain, Johnathan Thurston, kicked the winning field goal. Hunt played in 26 matches, scoring 12 tries and kicking 4 goals.

2016
On 12 January, Hunt was selected in the QAS Emerging Maroons squad. On 4 February, Hunt, along with eight other members of the Queensland Emerging squad, was banned from Queensland State of Origin selection for 12 months after breaking team curfew. In round 10, against the Manly-Warringah Sea Eagles, Hunt played his 150th NRL match in Brisbane's 30–6 win at Suncorp Stadium. Hunt managed still to play in all of Brisbane's 26 matches and score 7 tries. Hunt was added to the Australian Kangaroos 2016 Four Nations train-on squad but later failed to make the final 24-man squad.

2017
On 23 January, after much speculation on Hunt's future at the Brisbane club, with the Parramatta Eels and St. George Illawarra Dragons interested in signing him from the 2018 season onward, Hunt agreed to sign a multimillion-dollar five-year contract with the St. George starting in 2018. After starting the season well for Brisbane, in Round 6 against the Sydney Roosters, Hunt sustained a hamstring injury while performing a try-saving tackle on Roosters centre Latrell Mitchell, and was sidelined for 6 weeks. On 8 June, after the Brisbane's lost back-to-back matches after Hunt's return to the squad, Hunt was dropped to the Queensland Cup to play for the Ipswich Jets by coach Wayne Bennett. Bennett preferred Kodi Nikorima after he showed strong performances during Hunt's absence, resulting in 6 straight wins.
A month following Hunt's shock dropping, he was selected on the bench for Queensland for Game 3 of the State of Origin Series due to injuries to Darius Boyd and Jonathan Thurston in Game 2. Queensland won the series by defeating New South Wales 22–6. Hunt finished his last year with the Broncos with 21 matches and 7 tries. Hunt was selected in the 24-man Australia Kangaroos 2017 Rugby League World Cup squad. Hunt only played in 1 match in the tournament which was playing off the interchange bench in the Kangaroos 34–0 win over Lebanon at Sydney Football Stadium.

2018
On 28 January, reports came out about Hunt and Cameron Munster being involved in a punch-up in a night out in Darwin during the Kangaroos 2017 World Cup campaign after the 46-0 smashing victory over Samoa. The pair didn't take part in the match beforehand and Munster was reportedly sent home from the squad. In Round 1 of the 2018 NRL season, Hunt made his club debut for the St. George Illawarra Dragons against his former team the Brisbane Broncos, starting at halfback where he was running riot against his old teammates and scored a try under the posts by intercepting a wayward pass from Brisbane prop Matthew Lodge in the Dragons' 34–12 victory at Jubilee Oval.

On 28 May, Hunt was named as halfback to represent the Queensland Maroons in the 2018 State of Origin series. He was named in the side after brilliant form for his NRL club the St. George Illawarra Dragons and he was a major factor in St. George's sublime start to the season in which they won their first 6 games. Hunt was replaced as halfback by Cherry-Evans during State of Origin III, during the match he was allocated to sit on the bench as Cherry-Evans took his place. Hunt was part of the St. George Illawarra side which qualified for the finals for the first time since 2015 finishing 7th on the table at the end of the regular season.  In week one, St. George Illawarra defeated Brisbane 48–18 in a shock victory at Suncorp Stadium with Hunt starring for the saints.  The following week against Souths, Hunt scored a try but was heavily criticised after the match as Souths won 13–12. This was in relation to the final minute of the match with the scores locked at 12-12 as instead of kicking the ball downfield, Hunt elected to run the ball on the final tackle which handed possession over to Souths in good field position and ended with Adam Reynolds kicking the winning field goal. After the match, Hunt told the media "It was a pretty big error by me, to be honest".  Parramatta legend Peter Sterling labelled it the "dumbest play of the year" the following day on Nine's Sunday Footy Show.

2019
In Round 5 against Canterbury-Bankstown, Hunt scored two tries as St. George Illawarra won the match 40–4 at Kogarah Oval.  Hunt was later selected for Queensland in the 2019 State of Origin series and played in all 3 games as Queensland lost the series 2–1.  In the wake of St. George Illawarra's Round 18 loss against Penrith which ended in a 40–18 defeat, coach Paul McGregor came under intense criticism after he elected to rest Hunt from playing citing player welfare.

In round 25 against the Gold Coast, Hunt scored 2 tries as St. George Illawarra won the match 24–16 in the final game of the season as the club finished a disappointing 15th on the table.

On 30 September, Hunt was named at hooker in the Australia PM XIII side. On 7 October, Hunt was named in the Australian side for the 2019 Rugby League World Cup 9s and the upcoming Oceania Cup fixtures.

2020
He made a total of 19 appearances for St. George Illawarra in the 2020 NRL season as the side finished a disappointing 13th on the table.

2021
In round 2 of the 2021 NRL season, Hunt put in a man of the match performance as St. George Illawarra defeated North Queensland 25-18 at the Queensland Country Bank Stadium. Hunt was later selected as the reserve player for Queensland in Game 1 of the 2021 State of Origin series.
Hunt scored two tries in the third game to help prevent a clean sweep of the series and received the title of 'man of the match' for his performance.

On 2 August, it was announced that Hunt would miss at least four matches after breaking his arm in the club's 50-14 loss against South Sydney.

2022
Hunt captained St. George Illawarra for the second year, receiving praise for his consistent performances to start the season.  This included leading his side to a Round 7 victory against the Sydney Roosters on ANZAC Day. For his efforts, Hunt earned the Ashton Collier Spirit of Anzac Medal and received the title of 'man of the match'.  As a result of his excellent start to the season, Hunt was named as starting hooker in the 2022 State of Origin series and was placed at the top of the Dally M medal leaderboard as of Round 12 of the 2022 season. Hunt scored the final try in the third game, thereby securing the win for the Queensland Maroons.  In round 19 of the 2022 NRL season, Hunt scored two tries for St. George Illawarra in a 20-6 victory over Manly.  

Hunt placed third in the overall Dally M leaderboard for the year and was selected for the Australia national rugby league team following the end of the regular NRL season.  He also received the Dragons Player of the Year medal for the second consecutive season, acknowledging his stellar 2022 

On 6 October, Hunt signed a two-year contract extension to remain at St. George Illawarra until the end of 2025.
Hunt was later voted as the clubs player of the season at the St. George Illawarra awards night.

Hunt was selected by Australia for the 2021 Rugby League World Cup. Hunt played for Australia in their 2021 Rugby League World Cup final victory over Samoa.

Statistics

Personal life
Despite growing up in Queensland, Hunt is a self-proclaimed Cronulla-Sutherland Sharks fan. As a youngster he idolised Mat Rogers which was the reason he supported the Sharks. Hunt has also stated Andrew Johns as the player who most influenced his game.
Hunt's brother in law is North Queensland Cowboys hooker Jake Granville, and Hunt's wife, Bridget, is the niece of former Queensland player and coach Michael Hagan.

References

External links

St. George Illawarra Dragons profile

 

1990 births
Living people
Australia national rugby league team players
Australian rugby league players
Brisbane Broncos players
Central Queensland Capras players
Ipswich Jets players
Norths Devils players
Prime Minister's XIII players
Queensland Rugby League State of Origin players
Rugby league halfbacks
Rugby league hookers
Rugby league players from Rockhampton, Queensland
St. George Illawarra Dragons players